Hibbertia axillaris is a species of flowering plant in the family Dilleniaceae and is endemic to northern Western Australia. It is usually a multi-stemmed shrublet with ridged branchlets, foliage covered with scales and rosette-like hairs and mostly elliptic to lance-shaped leaves. The flowers are arranged singly in leaf axils, with forty-two to fifty stamens arranged around the three carpels.

Description
Its foliage is more or less densely covered with rosette-like hairs and scales. There are forty-two to fifty stamens arranged in groups around the two densely scaly carpels, each carpel with three or four ovules. Flowering occurs around June.

Taxonomy
Hibbertia axillaris was first formally described in 2010 by Hellmut R. Toelken in the Journal of the Adelaide Botanic Gardens from specimens collected near Mitchell Falls in 1985. The specific epithet (axillaris) means "axillary", referring to the flowers.

Distribution and habitat
This hibbertia is only known from the type specimen that was growing in sandy soil near a stream in woodland in the Kimberley region in northern Western Australia .

See also
List of Hibbertia species

References

axillaris
Eudicots of Western Australia
Plants described in 2010
Taxa named by Hellmut R. Toelken